Tony Harrison is a communications consultant from Tasmania who has worked in journalism and public relations, marketing and government relations. He is a former political journalist and former press secretary to two Tasmanian Premiers, a former corporate affairs manager with the Australian Tourist Commission and a former executive chairman of the Tasmanian public relations, marketing, and government relations consulting firm, Corporate Communications. In addition to these things, Tony Harrison has been involved in providing high-level corporate advice and political lobbying services to clients in Tasmania and Australia, as well as overseeing community consultation programs for the corporate sector and the government. He is the former National President of the Public Relations Institute of Australia (PRIA) and past President of the PRIA in Tasmania. 

Tony Harrison has won several awards in public relations and marketing, including a PRIA National Golden Target Gold Award in 2000 and 2003 for government communication. He was also awarded a special Tasmania Day Award for his service to the public relations profession. 

Outside the business, Tony Harrison is a Director of Cricket Australia (the former ACB) and former Chairman of Cricket Tasmania and a member of the Council of the Australian Institute of Company Directors (AICD).

Career
Harrison was on the PRIA Tasmanian Council for approximately 12 years and served as Vice President for two years, followed by four years as Tasmanian President.  He was involved in the organization of two national conferences held in Tasmania and was chairman of a highly successful 1992 Hobart event. Tony Harrison was instrumental in establishing the Tasmanian Awards for Excellence in conjunction with two sister organizations, the Australian Marketing Institute and the Advertising Club of Tasmania; and chaired the Awards committee for three terms. The Tasmanian awards became the benchmark for the establishment of similar State-based awards programs throughout Australia.

In 1996, he travelled to the United Kingdom to initiate talks with the Institute of Public Relations in London about reciprocal industry activities. In 1997 he visited Singapore and Malaysia as a representative of the PRIA to be a keynote speaker in consecutive industry professional development seminars.  He was a keynote speaker at the 1993 PRIA national convention in Sydney, the 1996 Public Relations Institute of New Zealand (PRINZ) Convention in Rotorua, New Zealand and the 1997 joint PRIA/PRINZ convention in Auckland.  He also chaired the 1997 Public Relations Industry Summit in Sydney.

References

Year of birth missing (living people)
Living people
Australian lobbyists
People from Tasmania